Amitabh Ghosh is an Indian planetary geologist. Ghosh did his schooling at Don Bosco, Park Circus, Kolkata. An IITian from Kharagpur, he was a key member of the team who identified the landing site for Curiosity, the Gale crater location. Ghosh has played prominent roles in various other missions by NASA such as the Mars Pathfinder Mission and the MER (Mars Exploration Rover) mission. He was the only Asian in the Pathfinder mission by NASA.

He has been honoured with NASA Mars Pathfinder Achievement Award in the year 1997 and the NASA Mars Exploration Rover Achievement Award in 2004.

References

Planetary scientists
Indian geologists
NASA people
Astrogeologists
Living people
Year of birth missing (living people)
People from Paschim Medinipur district
Scientists from West Bengal